Gerald Jones (born 21 August 1970) is a Welsh Labour Party politician. He has been the Member of Parliament (MP) for Merthyr Tydfil and Rhymney since 2015 and has served as a Shadow Welsh Office minister.

Political career

The industrial decline of the 1980s and the 1984–85 Miner's strike led Jones, at the age of 14, to become active in the community struggle to support miners.

He joined the Labour Party in 1988 and has served in a range of roles including Chairperson of New Tredegar Branch Labour Party and the Merthyr Tydfil & Rhymney Constituency Labour Party. Between 2003 and 2015, he also played a role in UK General Elections and Welsh Assembly Election Campaigns across Merthyr Tydfil and Rhymney as Election Agent.

Jones was elected as a Labour Councillor to Caerphilly County Borough Council in 1995, representing his home community of New Tredegar. For 20 years, he represented his community and held an active calendar of advice surgeries and attended many community events, being accessible to local residents. He also served as Deputy Leader of the Council and between 2012 and 2015 also served as Cabinet Member for Housing where he drove the council's commitment to delivering the Welsh Housing Quality Standard programme. Jones also served as the Anti Poverty and Homelessness Champion.

He is also member of the GMB union and the Co-operative Party.

He supported Owen Smith in the failed attempt to replace Jeremy Corbyn in the 2016 Labour leadership election.

Jones was first elected as the Member of Parliament for Merthyr Tydfil & Rhymney in the 2015 General Election and was subsequently re-elected at the 2017 and 2019 elections.

Having served as a Parliamentary Private Secretary (PPS) to the Shadow Wales and Defence teams, he was appointed by Labour leader Jeremy Corbyn as a Shadow Wales Minister in October 2016 and a Shadow Defence Minister in July 2017.

As of June 2015, he is one of 125 MPs who employ a member of their family; he employs his partner as a senior parliamentary assistant.

Personal life

Jones was born in 1970 in Phillipstown, New Tredegar: a small community in the Upper Rhymney Valley.

He is openly gay and employs his partner, Tyrone Powell as his Senior Parliamentary Assistant.

References

External links

1970 births
Welsh Labour Party MPs
LGBT members of the Parliament of the United Kingdom
Welsh LGBT politicians
Welsh gay men
Gay politicians
Living people
UK MPs 2015–2017
UK MPs 2017–2019
UK MPs 2019–present